Let Them Come is a 2015 French-Algerian drama film directed by Salem Brahimi. It was screened in the Contemporary World Cinema section of the 2015 Toronto International Film Festival.

Cast
 Rachida Brakni as Yasmina
 Amazigh Kateb as Nouredine
 Farida Saboundji as The Mother
 Rayhana Obermeyer

References

External links
 

2015 films
2015 drama films
French drama films
2010s Arabic-language films
2010s French-language films
Algerian drama films
Algerian multilingual films
French multilingual films
2010s French films